The Rainbow Arch Bridge at Valley City, North Dakota, also known as Main Street Bridge, is a Marsh Rainbow Arch structure that was built in 1925. One year later it was designated as part of an overlap with US 10 and US 52, but was replaced by business routes of both roads and later given the additional overlap of Interstate Business Route 94 which gradually replaced the U.S. business routes. It was listed on the National Register of Historic Places on February 27, 1997,

but was demolished and replaced in 2004.

It was removed from the National Register in September, 2004. A small park with a memorial to the previous bridge can be found along the sidewalk on the southwest bank of the Sheyenne River.

See also
List of bridges documented by the Historic American Engineering Record in North Dakota

References

External links

Road bridges on the National Register of Historic Places in North Dakota
Bridges completed in 1925
Historic American Engineering Record in North Dakota
U.S. Route 10
U.S. Route 52
Interstate 94
National Register of Historic Places in Barnes County, North Dakota
Tied arch bridges in the United States
Former National Register of Historic Places in North Dakota
Demolished bridges in the United States
2000s disestablishments in North Dakota